"World's Smallest Violin" is a song recorded by the American pop band AJR. It was released on March 26, 2021, as the fifth and final single from the band's fourth studio album OK Orchestra and as a music video. In 2022, the song became a viral song on the social media platform TikTok, with many using the ending verse and the line "I'll blow up into smithereens" as a soundbite on the site as fan edits or by throwing back to viral videos.

Background and composition 
The song speaks about trying to minimize one's pain and comparing one's pain to another, for example, seeing a therapist (mentioned in the line "I think I bored my therapist"), having a grandfather that fought in World War II (mentioned in the line "my grandpa fought in World War II") and a great-grandfather who was a fireman (mentioned in the line "his dad was a fireman"). The music features transitions between a violin, a trumpet, and a piano. The song is described as, according to The Daily Californian: 

In a TikTok made by the band themselves, production for the song included creating a beat with clapping and stomping their feet. To make background vocals, a vocoder was used. The band also wanted to try to flawlessly seam a transition from a violin to vocals to a guitar, with a theatrical ending to the song where "everything comes at once", with a continuously speeding up verse.

Critical reception 
Initial reception for "World's Smallest Violin" was favorable to mixed. Music critic for Variety, A. D. Amorosi wrote that the song did not fit in well with the album's message of an emotionally deep and thought-provoking; however, Amorosi wrote that the song, removed from the album, would work well. Zachary Wittman, writer for The Globe, wrote a negative review on the OK Orchestra album itself; however, he found "World's Smallest Violin" to be "passable", saying "[it] is the second passable song on here with a nice melody and a really fun lyrical concept. Again though, they ruin it with some horrid turns of phrases. I understand the metaphor of the world's smallest violin needing to be played is the equivalent of needing to vent to someone about your mental health, but they did not need to say 'spew my tiny symphony.'"

Music video 
On the same day as its release, a music video was released for "World's Smallest Violin". In the video, AJR performs the song in an apartment while strange things happen around them, such as things breaking, instruments floating, and a tornado blowing papers around the room. The video ends with the room and members Adam and Ryan suddenly freezing, as member Jack looks around in confusion.

The music video had a spike in views after the song went viral; it is currently the most viewed video on AJR's YouTube channel, with 130 million views as of March 5, 2023.

Commercial performance 
Just over a year after the song was initially released, "World's Smallest Violin" went viral on social media platform TikTok, leading to a spike in views on the official music video on YouTube and streams on Spotify. It is currently the most viewed video on the AJR YouTube channel.

Charts

Weekly charts

Year-end charts

Certifications

References 

2021 songs
2021 singles
AJR (band) songs